Václav Peřina (born 19 February 1945) is a Czech cross-country skier. He competed in the men's 15 kilometre event at the 1968 Winter Olympics.

References

1945 births
Living people
Czech male cross-country skiers
Olympic cross-country skiers of Czechoslovakia
Cross-country skiers at the 1968 Winter Olympics
Sportspeople from Hradec Králové